The Joel Frazer House is a historic residence near Cynthiana, Kentucky, United States, that was built in 1810 by the stonemason and future Kentucky governor Thomas Metcalf.  It was listed on the National Register of Historic Places in 1983.  The house is on the north bank of the "Licking River" per its National Register nomination, which near Cynthiana would mean what is actually termed South Fork Licking River.

Approximately  around the house was designated as historic; besides the house itself, two related structures qualified as contributing properties. The house itself is a three-bay stone building, one-and-a-half stories tall, located on the bank of the Licking River.

It was listed on the National Register as part of a survey of historic stone buildings in central Kentucky.

Its location, as its Kentucky Historic Resources document merely describes, is near Cynthiana off Kentucky Route 982.

See also
List of buildings constructed by Thomas Metcalfe

Notes

References

Houses on the National Register of Historic Places in Kentucky
Federal architecture in Kentucky
Houses completed in 1810
Houses in Harrison County, Kentucky
National Register of Historic Places in Harrison County, Kentucky
Thomas Metcalfe buildings
Stone houses in Kentucky
1810 establishments in Kentucky